The Cork-Galway rivalry is a Gaelic football rivalry between Irish county teams Cork and Galway, who first played each other in 1911. The fixture has been an infrequent one in the history of the championship, and therefore the rivalry is not as intense between the two teams. Cork's home ground is Páirc Uí Chaoimh and Galway's home ground is Pearse Stadium, however, all of their championship meetings have been held at neutral venues, usually Croke Park.

While Cork have the second highest number of Munster titles and Galway are second only to Mayo in Connacht, they have also enjoyed All-Ireland Senior Football Championship successes, having won 16 championship titles between them to date.

All-time results

Legend

Senior

{| class="wikitable" style="font-size:90%"
|-
!width=1 | 
!width=5 | No.
!width=120 | Date 
!width=100 | Winners
!width=70 | Score
!width=100 | Runners-up
!width=130 | Venue
!width=160 | Competition
|-
|style="background-color:#FF0000"| ||1. || 3 December 1911 || Cork|| 3-4 - 0-2 || Galway|| Portlaoise || All-Ireland semi-final
|-
|style="background-color:#FF0000"| ||2. || 12 August 1945 || Cork|| 2-12 - 2-8 || Galway|| Croke Park || All-Ireland semi-final
|-
|style="background-color:#800000"| ||3. || 7 October 1956 || Galway || 2-13 - 3-7 || Cork|| Croke Park || All-Ireland final
|-
|style="background-color:#FF0000"| ||4. || 11 August 1957 || Cork || 2-4 - 0-9 || Galway|| Croke Park || All-Ireland semi-final
|-
|style="background-color:#800000"| ||5. || 7 August 1966 || Galway || 1-11 - 1-9 || Cork|| Croke Park || All-Ireland semi-final
|-
|style="background-color:#FF0000"| ||6. || 23 September 1973 || Cork || 3-17 - 2-13 || Galway|| Croke Park || All-Ireland final
|-
|style=| || 7. || 16 August 1987 || Cork || 1-11 - 1-11 || Galway|| Croke Park || All-Ireland semi-final
|-
|style="background-color:#FF0000"| || 8. || 30 August 1987 || Cork || 0-18 - 1-4 || Galway|| Croke Park || All-Ireland semi-final Replay
|-
|style="background-color:#800000"| || 9. || 22 July 2001 || Galway || 1-14 - 1-10 || Cork|| Croke Park || All-Ireland qualifier round 4
|-
|style="background-color:#FF0000"| || 10. || 7 August 2005 || Cork || 2-14 - 2-11 || Galway || Croke Park || All-Ireland quarter-final
|-
|style="background-color:#FF0000"| || 11. || 27 May 2013 || Cork || 1-17 - 1-16 || Galway || Croke Park || All-Ireland qualifier round 4
|-

References

Galway
Galway county football team rivalries